Karl Hans Albrecht (20 February 1920 – 16 July 2014) was a German entrepreneur who founded the discount supermarket chain Aldi with his brother Theo. He was for many years the richest person in Germany. In February 2014, he was ranked the 21st-richest person in the world by Hurun Report.

Biography 

Karl and Theo Albrecht were born and raised in a Catholic family in modest circumstances in Essen, Germany. Their father, Karl Sr, was employed as a miner and later as a baker's assistant. Theo completed an apprenticeship in his mother's store, while Karl worked in a delicatessen shop. Karl served in the Wehrmacht during World War II and was wounded on the Eastern Front. After the war, the brothers jointly took over their mother's business and founded Albrecht KG.

In 1960, the brothers had a disagreement over whether to stock cigarettes. While Theo wanted to sell them, Karl believed they would attract shoplifters. As a result, they divided their stores into two parts, with Theo retaining all stores north of the Ruhr, while Karl retained all stores south of the Ruhr.  The first Aldi (short for Albrecht Discount) was opened in 1962, and the two groups became known as Aldi Nord and Aldi Süd, respectively.

In 1994, Karl Albrecht removed himself from the daily operations of Aldi Süd and took the position of chairman of the board until 2002. At the beginning of 2002, he also relinquished this position, thereby completely ceding control of the firm. As of 2010s, the business is no longer run by any of Karl Albrecht's family members.

Personal life
Karl Albrecht was a very reclusive man, who had not taken part in public life for several years prior to his death. As a result, little is known about him. Forbes magazine reported that he had two children, neither of whom was employed by Aldi. He reportedly lived in Essen, as did his brother Theo until the latter's death. Golf was one of his hobbies, and Albrecht played the sport on his own golf course, the Öschberghof, which he built in 1976. He also raised orchids.

Fortune 

Forbes magazine listed him as the third richest man in the world in 2004. Upon his death, Albrecht was named the richest person in Germany, and the fourth-richest in Europe.

References

External links
 Forbes topic page on Karl Albrecht
 Obituary in The Independent by Marcus Williamson

1920 births
2014 deaths
German businesspeople in retailing
German billionaires
German company founders
20th-century German businesspeople
Businesspeople from Essen
People from the Rhine Province
German Roman Catholics
Aldi people
Wehrmacht